Payanoor is a village in Kancheepuram district in the Indian state of Tamil Nadu. It is the nearest area to Mahabalipuram. It is located on Old Mahabalipuram Road.

Location
Payanoor is located on State Highway Old Mahabalipuram Road, 48 km away from Chennai and 7 km away from the famous tourist town Mahabalipuram and it is 4 km away from East Coast Road.

References

Cities and towns in Kanchipuram district